Harpal Singh Sathi is a leader of Bharatiya Janata Party from Uttarakhand. He served as member of the Lok Sabha representing Haridwar. He was elected to 11th, 12th and 13th Lok Sabha.

References

India MPs 1996–1997
People from Haridwar district
1942 births
Living people
Lok Sabha members from Uttarakhand
Bharatiya Janata Party politicians from Uttarakhand
India MPs 1998–1999
India MPs 1999–2004
Lok Sabha members from Uttar Pradesh